A soft landing in the business cycle is the process of an economy shifting from growth to slow-growth to potentially flat, as it approaches but avoids a recession. It is usually caused by government attempts to slow down inflation. The criteria for distinguishing between a hard and soft landing are numerous and subjective.

The term was adapted to economics from its origins in the early days of flight, when it historically was the method of the landing of hot air balloons, by gradually reducing their buoyancy. It later also applied to aviation, gliders and spacecraft, as in the Lunar lander.

In the United States, modern recessions and hard and soft landings follow from Federal Reserve tightening cycles, in which the Federal funds rate is increased over several consecutive moves. In modern times, the most notable, and possibly the only true soft landing in the most recent 16 business cycles occurred in the soft landing of 1994, engineered by Federal Reserve Chairman Alan Greenspan through fine tuning of interest rates and the money supply. A soft landing by a central bank is when "the central bank tightens monetary policy to fight inflation but does not cause a recession." If it causes a recession, then it is a hard landing.

In addition to being a certain type of business cycle, a soft landing may also refer to a market segment or industry sector that is expected to slow down, but to not crash, while the wider economy may not experience such a slow down at that time. For example, a contemporary newspaper headline read: "Soft landing forecast for house prices as rate hikes stem growth".

As it stands, these forecasts have very little scientific value and there is not one single verifiable instance of a soft landing following an economic bubble. This is enforced by definition, as any potential bubble followed by a soft landing would, in retrospect, not be deemed a bubble.

See also
 Hard landing (economics)
 Recession
 Business cycle
 Inverted yield curve

References

Business cycle